is a Prefectural Natural Park in Wakayama Prefecture, Japan. Established in 2010, the park spans the borders of the municipalities of Kozagawa, Shirahama, and Susami. The park's central feature is the eponymous .

See also
 National Parks of Japan
 List of Places of Scenic Beauty of Japan (Wakayama)

References

External links
  Map of Kozagawa Prefectural Natural Park

Parks and gardens in Wakayama Prefecture
Kozagawa, Wakayama
Shirahama, Wakayama
Susami, Wakayama
Protected areas established in 2010
2010 establishments in Japan